Dixie Seatle is a Canadian actress and faculty member in the Acting for Film and Television program at Humber College's School of Creative and Performing Arts in Toronto, Ontario.
Her first film credit was a supporting role in the 1978 production of A Gift to Last.
Seatle won Gemini Awards for her work on the series 
Adderly and Paradise Falls

She is a graduate of Dawson College and the National Theatre School in Montreal.
She has also taught at the Stratford Festival, the Toronto Centre for the Arts, George Brown College, and Earl Haig Secondary School.

In an op-ed published in September 2014, in The Globe and Mail, triggered by observing a farmer sending a cow to the slaughterhouse, due to its record of miscarriages, Seatle wrote about bonding with the cow over the loss of an offspring, because she too had lost a child.

Filmography

Film

Television

References

External links 
 
 Dixie Seatle bio at Humber's School of Creative and Performing Arts

Living people
Canadian television actresses
Best Actress in a Drama Series Canadian Screen Award winners
Year of birth missing (living people)
Best Supporting Actress in a Drama Series Canadian Screen Award winners